Suar or Suwara is a small river located in Kaimur District of Bihar, India. It is a tributary of Durgawati River. It flows through the Districts of Rohtas and Kaimur.

References 

Rivers of Bihar